Long Shan Tang Temple is a Hokkien Chinese clan temple (also called Kongsi) located on Anawrahta Road in Latha Township, part of Yangon's Chinatown. It was founded by members of the Tseng and Khoo clans from Fujian province in 1877. This temple is dedicated for ancestral worship.

References

See also
Fushan Temple
Guanyin Gumiao Temple
Kheng Hock Keong Temple
Khoo Kongsi in Penang, Malaysia 

Buddhist temples in Yangon